Bachelor Point is a Bangladeshi comedy drama series, started at 4 August 2018 which is aired on Channel Nine. It is directed by Kajal Arefin Ome and it stars Mishu Sabbir, Tawsif Mahbub, Ziaul Haque Polash, Shamim Hasan Sarkar, Chashi Alam, Marzuk Russell, Tanjin Tisha, Nadia Afrin Mim, Sabila Nur, Sanjana Sarkar Riya, Musafire Syed Bachchu, Mukit Zakaria and Naim Khan Turjo in the lead roles.

Bachelor Point season 1 ended on 31 January 2019 and season 2 started from 21 November 2019 and ended temporarily on 4 April 2020 for the COVID-19 outbreak, it aired on Banglavision and Dhruba TV YouTube channel. Bachelor Point started airing again from 10 September 2020 and ended on 9 October 2020. Season 3 started from 10 October 2020 and ended on 13 April 2021. The producer announced that the season 4 will start from March 11, 2022.

This show has been a huge breakthrough for lead actor and producer Ziaul Hoque Polash (Portrayed as Kabila).

Plot 
Bachelor point is a comedy based drama directed by Kajal Arefin Ome & Salman Farsi The main plot of this drama is leading a bachelor life in the city, Dhaka. It is about people from different districts and regions living in a Bachelor Point together in the city, Dhaka.

Cast 
 Ziaul Hoque Polash as Kabila (season 1- present)
 Mishu Sabbir as Shuvo (season 1- present)
 Mahbub Alam Chashi as Habu (season 1- present) 
 Marzuk Russell as Pasha (Habu's cousin and top terror of Kashimpur) (season 2- present)
 Musafire Syed Bachchu as Bachchu (Hooligan of Area) (season 1 present; recurring)
 Mukit Zakaria as Zakir (season 1 present; recurring)
 Sabila Nur as Nabila (season 1- present)
 Monira Mithu as Shirin (Nabila, Nafisa and Nirala's mother) (season 1- present; recurring)
 Abdullah Rana as Rana (Nabila, Nafisa and Nirala's father) (season 1- present; recurring)
 Sanjana Sarkar Riya as Riya (season 2- present)
 Sumon Patwary as Cocktail Babu (season 3- present; recurring)
 Shoraf Ahmed Jibon as Ata Mia / Borhan (season 3- present)
 Faria Shahrin as Antara (season 3- present) 
 Parsa Evana as Eva (season 4- present)
 Ashutosh Sujon as Juwel, (Nabila, Nafisa and Nirala's uncle) (season 4- present)
 Md. Saidur Rahman Pavel as Bojra Bazar Zakir (season 3- present)
 Mashrur Enan (Keto Bhai) as Zubayer Halim (season 3)
 Saima Shaika Alam as Sadia (season 3-present)
 Lamima Lam as Lamia (season 3- present)
 Israt Punam (season 1- present; recurring)
 Jannatul Ferdous Ritu (season 3- present; recurring)
 Labonno Bindu as Bindu (season 3- present)
 Shimul Sharma as Shimul (season 1- present; recurring) 
 Leona Lubaina Islam as Leona (season 1- present)
 Hindol Roy as Arefin's father (season 1- present; recurring)
 Shopna Sheikh as Arefin's stepmother (season 1- present; recurring)
 Nazmul Hasan Naeem as Naeem Mostafa (season 1-2)
 Naim Khan Turjo as Turjo (season 2-present; recurring)
 Tawsif Mahbub as Nehal (season 1-2)
 Shamim Hasan Sarkar as Arefin (season 1-2)
 Nadia Afrin Mim as Nafisa (season 1-2)
 Tanjin Tisha as Nirala (season 1)
 Toriqul Islam Tusher as Hunter Zanowar (season 1-2)
 Tamim Mridha as Adit (season 2)
 Tasnova Hoque Elvin as Elvin (season 1)
 Irfan Sajjad as Sajjad, Elvin's brother (season 1)
 Fakhrul Bashar Masum as Shuvo's father (season 1- present; recurring)
 Gulshan Ara Ahmed as Poly Chairman, Kabila's mother (season 1-present; recurring)
 Zaki Ahmed Zarif Abdullah as Sajib (Arefin's cousin) (season 1)
 Tanzim Hasan Anik as Drogba (season 2-present; recurring)
 Sifat Shahrin as Rehana (season 1-present; recurring)

Schedules and episodes

TV sequel
 Bachelor Trip
 Bachelor Eid
 Bachelor Quarantine
 Bachelor's Ramadan
 Bachelor's Qurbani
 Bachelor's Football

References

External links
 

2018 television seasons
2019 television seasons
2020 television seasons
Bangladeshi drama television series
2010s Bangladeshi drama television series
Channel 9 (Bangladeshi TV channel) original programming